István Spitzmüller (born 14 May 1986 in Debrecen) is a Hungarian football (Midfielder) player who currently plays for STC Salgótarján.

Club statistics

Updated to games played as of 23 November 2014.

Sources
Profile on hlsz.hu 
Profile on dvsc.hu 
István Spitzmüller at Soccerway

References

1986 births
Living people
People from Hajdúnánás
Hungarian footballers
Association football midfielders
Debreceni VSC players
Nyíregyháza Spartacus FC players
Nemzeti Bajnokság I players
Sportspeople from Hajdú-Bihar County